Luciano Guiñazu (born November 1, 1971 in Buenos Aires, Argentina) is a former Argentine footballer who played for clubs of Argentina, Chile, Mexico and El Salvador.

Teams
  Ferro Carril Oeste 1991–1992
  Deportes Concepción 1993–1995
  Ituzaingó 1996–1997
  Estudiantes de Buenos Aires 1997–1999
  Aguascalientes 1999–2001
  Correcaminos 2001
  FAS 2002–2003
  Lobos de Tlaxcala 2003–2005

Titles
  Deportes Concepción 1994 (Chilean Primera B Championship)

References
 

1971 births
Living people
Argentine footballers
Argentine expatriate footballers
Ferro Carril Oeste footballers
Deportes Concepción (Chile) footballers
Chilean Primera División players
Argentine Primera División players
Expatriate footballers in Chile
Expatriate footballers in Mexico
Expatriate footballers in El Salvador
Association footballers not categorized by position
Footballers from Buenos Aires